The DC Breeze is an open professional ultimate team based in the District of Columbia, competing in the East Division of the American Ultimate Disc League. The team first played in the 2013 season. The Breeze play at Carlini Field (Catholic University).

History

2013 
In the Breeze's inaugural season the team played its home games at Anacostia High School in East DC. They went 4–12 in the regular season and did not qualify for the playoffs. The Breeze finished fifth in the East Division.

2014 
The Breeze moved to the University of Maryland Field Hockey and Lacrosse Complex for their second season after playing their 2014 home opener at George Mason High School in Falls Church, Virginia. The opener was the professional debut for highly touted University of Pittsburgh graduates Alex Thorne and Tyler DeGirolamo, and was a nail biter to the end as the Breeze fell one goal short of heavily favored AUDL defending champions Toronto Rush, 20–19. To date this is still the only Breeze game played in Virginia. The team went 10–4 in the regular season, finishing in third place in the East Division and making its first playoff appearance, where the team lost to the Rush again. 2014 also marks the first season that Alex "Dutchy" Ghesquiere served as head coach.

2015 
The Breeze moved to Gallaudet University in 2015, and were again coached by Alex Ghesquiere. League expansion to Pittsburgh and Raleigh took regional talent away from the Breeze, and the team went 7–7 in the regular season, failing to qualify for the playoffs.

2016 
The Breeze again played home games at Gallaudet University, and were again coached by Alex Ghesquiere. They got back to winning ways, going 10–4 in the regular season for a second-place finish and earning a home playoff game for the first time. The team won its home playoff game vs the New York Empire for its first ever postseason victory, but then lost the East Division final to the Toronto Rush.

2017 
The Breeze made a coaching change in 2017, hiring Darryl Stanley as head coach while Ghesquiere moved into an oversight role as Technical Director after leading the team from the sideline the previous three years. The team again went 10–4 and finished in second place, and once again won a home playoff game, this time against the Montréal Royal. And for the second consecutive season, the Breeze lost to Toronto in the Division Final.

2018 
Head Coach Darryl Stanley returned to lead the Breeze again in 2018, serving the first of a two-year contract extension. He guided the team to an 8–5–1 record, a second-place finish in the AUDL East, and the team's fourth playoff appearance in the last five years. The season ended July 21 with a rain-soaked playoff loss, 19–15 to the New York Empire. However, this was the year of Matthew "Rowan" McDonnell on the field. McDonnell served as a team captain while collecting 38 goals, 47 assists and 11 blocks. The goal and assist totals both led the team, and he won the league's 2018 AUDL MVP Award.

2019 
Reigning AUDL MVP Matthew "Rowan" McDonnell returned as captain of the Breeze in 2019, and Head Coach Darryl Stanley also returned to lead the team from the sidelines for the third consecutive season. The duo guided the team to a 7–5 record, a third place finish in the AUDL East, and the team's fifth playoff appearance in the last six years. The season ended July 20 with another heartbreaking playoff loss, this time 22–21 to the Toronto Rush in a game played in New York. The season was once again highlighted by McDonnell's performance on the field. He followed up his MVP 2018 season with 67 goals, 51 assists and 5 blocks in a campaign that earned him both All-AUDL 1st Team and MVP Finalist honors. The 2019 Breeze roster also produced two All-AUDL Rookie 2nd Team members in AJ Merriman and Garrett Braun.

2020 
The Breeze were prepared to compete in the newly formed Atlantic Division and had constructed one of the most talented rosters in team history before the season was canceled due to the COVID-19 pandemic.

2021 
On March 5, 2021, the AUDL announced games would return after the loss of the 2020 season. Instead of starting in early April, as had been the historical standard, it was announced the schedule would run from early June through mid-August before playoffs and ultimately, AUDL Championship Weekend in September. The New York Empire and upstart Boston Glory were shifted from the East Division into a newly-formed eight-team Atlantic Division, as the league contended with COVID-19-related difficulties with the Canadian border, leading to the creation of the Canada Cup. Prior to the AUDL's announcement, the Breeze also announced that Rowan McDonnell signed a two-year contract to keep him in Washington, DC through the 2022 season. McDonnell spent most of 2021 nursing a nagging hamstring injury and saw his role evolve from a true handler and downfield threat into more of a reliable veteran role player. After playing in three games for the Breeze between 2017-2018, rising star Jonny Malks returned for the 2021 season and immediately became a force on the Breeze O-Line. Malks was picked as the unanimous mid-season MVP and helped lead the team to a 10-2 season, its fifth consecutive playoff appearance and sixth in the last seven seasons. 2021 was also a breakout season for 20-year-old AJ Merriman, who racked up 19 assists, 15 goals, and 20 blocks on his way to being named the AUDL Defensive Player of the Year. Due to the unique nature of the Atlantic Division in 2021, four teams qualified for the playoffs, and the winners of each first-round game advanced to Championship Weekend, which was held in Washington, DC for the first time. The Breeze saw their Championship Weekend hopes dashed once again, falling to the eventual AUDL Champion Raleigh Flyers by a score of 16-19 at Carlini Field in Washington, DC on September 3, 2021.

Year-by-year

Full Schedule

All-time record by opponent

Rosters

References

External links 
 

Ultimate (sport) teams
Sports teams in Washington, D.C.
Ultimate teams established in 2013
2013 establishments in Washington, D.C.